The 2013 Cooper Tires British Formula 3 International Series season was the 63rd British Formula Three Championship season. The series, promoted by the Stéphane Ratel Organisation, began on 25 May at Silverstone and ended on 22 September at the Nürburgring after twelve races to be held at four meetings. The championship was won by Jordan King.

Regulation changes
After all races awarded equal championship points during the 2012 season, the 2013 season saw the re-introduction of fewer points awarded to drivers in the second race. The first and third races awarded points using the same system as used in Formula One – with twenty-five points for the winner, down to one point for tenth place – with the reverse-grid race offering twelve points for the winner down to half a point for tenth place.

A five-race "mini-series" for older-specification Formula Three cars was also scheduled to be introduced for the 2013 season, after only two drivers competed in a full-season campaign in the Rookie class, in 2012. However, with the championship realignment in January 2013, older-specification cars were able to compete at every meeting.

Drivers and teams

Driver changes
 Sun Zheng will join CF Racing for 2013 after competed China Touring Car Championship and Audi R8 LMS Cup in 2012 season.

Race calendar and results
A provisional ten-round calendar was announced on 28 July 2012. This was later revised down to nine rounds – with series organisers SRO open to the addition of a tenth meeting – on 18 December 2012. In January 2013, SRO reduced the calendar yet further, to just four triple-header meetings; two events in the United Kingdom and two overseas, in Belgium and Germany.

Notes

Championship standings

References

External links
 The official website of the British Formula 3 Championship

British Formula Three Championship seasons
Formula Three season
British Formula 3
British Formula 3 Championship